Choice of Games LLC is a video game developer based in California that creates interactive fiction.

They create their games in the custom-made ChoiceScript programming language, which is designed for writing multiple-choice games with a small number of variables.

The company was founded by Dan Fabulich and Adam Strong-Morse in 2009. It has been noted for making games that are accessible to the visually impaired. Its games have been praised for their diverse portrayals of gender and sexuality.

The company also hosts user-submitted games under the Hosted Games label on their site and app store listing in exchange for a share of the profits. In late 2019 the company introduced the romance-focused label Heart's Choice.

Titles

Hosted titles

References

External links

American companies established in 2009
Video game companies based in California
Video game development companies
Video game companies established in 2009
Interactive fiction
2009 establishments in California
Privately held companies based in California